Eddie Nartey (born 6 November 1984) is a Ghanaian actor, director, and film producer. His supporting role in Frank Rajah's Somewhere In Africa earned him a nomination at the Nollywood and African Film Critics Awardsf, and Ghana movie awards. He was nominated in the best actor category for Kiss Me If You Can., He got his first opportunity to do his directorial debut entitled Could This Be Love where he co-wrote the movie with Evelyn, which cast Actors like Majid Michel, Kwadwo Nkansah (Lil Win), Nana Ama Mcbrown, Fred Amugi, and Gloria Sarfo.

He collaborated with Juliet Ibrahim on the movie Shattered Romance. He also wrote and directed the movie Royal Diadem.

He is related to British Actor / Director  Danny Erskine.

Early life
Eddie attended Korle Gonno Methodist primary and JSS in Accra for basic education. His secondary education came at Holy Trinity Cathedral Secondary School (HOTCASS). He attended the University of Ghana, Legon where he studied directing and earned a BFA in Fine Arts.

Personal life 
His wife died in January 2021 after two years of marriage.

Filmography 
He has acted in several films, including:

He has directed and produced:

 Could This Be Love
 Shattered Romance
 Royal Diadem
 She Prayed
Beautiful Ruins
In April
Samai
Criss Cross
That Night
The Corner TV Series
Conversation
The New Adabraka
Frema
Woman At War
Kofi Abebrese
Okada

Awards

References

1984 births
Living people
Ghanaian male film actors
People from Accra
20th-century Ghanaian male actors
21st-century Ghanaian male actors
Ghanaian film directors
Ghanaian male child actors